Madonna and Child with Saint John the Baptist and Saint Catherine of Alexandria is a 1515 oil on canvas painting by Cima da Conegliano, now in the Morgan Library in New York.

References

1515 paintings
Paintings of the Madonna and Child by Cima da Conegliano
Paintings depicting John the Baptist
Paintings of Catherine of Alexandria
Collection of the Morgan Library & Museum